South Branch Leach Creek is a tributary of Leach Creek in Lackawanna County, Pennsylvania, in the United States. A substantial portion of the watershed is situated within coal measures. The creek also experiences seepage into mine workings via both surface seepage and streambed seepage.

Course
South Branch Leach Creek begins on the slopes of West Mountain, on or near the border between Scranton and Ransom Township. It flows down the mountain in an east-southeast direction for a short distance before crossing Interstate 476 and continuing east-southeast. For the next several tenths of a mile, it continues flowing down the mountain until it reaches its confluence with Leach Creek near Terrace Lane and Pennsylvania Route 307.

South Branch Leach Creek enters Leach Creek on the latter creek's right.

Hydrology, geography, and geology

Coal is located within the watershed of South Branch Leach Creek.

Watershed
The creek is entirely within the United States Geological Survey quadrangle of Scranton.

A mid-20th-century report listed the creek as being part of the North 3 Watershed, along with several other creeks.

Interstate 476 crosses Leach Creek in its upper reaches.

South Branch Leach Creek is a Trout Stocked Fishery for its entire length.

History
South Branch Leach Creek was entered into the Geographic Names Information System on January 1, 1990. Its identifier in the Geographic Names Information System is 1202409. The creek was added due to its presence in Patton's Philadelphia and Suburbs Street and Road Map, which was published in 1984.

A mid-20th-century report found the length of the streambed of South Branch Leach Creek within coal measures to be .

See also
List of rivers of Pennsylvania
List of tributaries of the Lackawanna River

References

Rivers of Lackawanna County, Pennsylvania
Tributaries of the Lackawanna River
Rivers of Pennsylvania